is a public park in Kita, Tokyo, Japan.

History

In the early eighteenth century, shōgun Tokugawa Yoshimune planted many cherry trees in the area and opened up the land for the enjoyment of the "Edokko" or citizens of Tokyo. The park was formally established, alongside Ueno Park, Shiba Park, Asakusa Park, and Fukagawa Park, in 1873 by the Dajō-kan, as Japan's first public parks.

Preserved railway vehicles
The park is home to two preserved railway vehicles: former Toei 6000 series tram car number 6080 and JNR Class D51 steam locomotive number D51 853.

Access

The closest station to the park is Ōji Station on the JR Keihin-Tohoku Line.

See also
 Parks and gardens in Tokyo
 One Hundred Famous Views of Edo (View 17)

References

External links

  
 Three Museums of Asukayama Park 

Kita, Tokyo
Parks and gardens in Tokyo